The Union Street Pedestrian Bridge is a bridge in Seattle, in the U.S. state of Washington. The bridge connects Western Avenue to the waterfront and replaces a metal staircase. The bridge, stairs and elevator opened in December 2022 following approximately two years of construction. The project features two artworks by local artist Norie Sato, including a screen wall and an approximately 37 foot tall steel sculpture inspired by a feather.

References

External links
 

2022 establishments in Washington (state)
Bridges completed in 2022
Bridges in Seattle
Central Waterfront, Seattle
Pedestrian bridges in Washington (state)